Fábio Cortez Torres (born 3 April 1974) is a Brazilian football manager. He is the current assistant manager of Vasco da Gama.

Career
Cortez was a futsal player before switching to coaching with Barra Futsal. He then coached Vasco da Gama until 2008, when he switched to football with Atlético Mineiro.

In 2010, shortly after his return to Vasco's futsal section, Cortez accepted an offer from the Kuwait national futsal team to work as their coach; he was also in charge of Qadsia. He returned to Vasco in 2017, as an assistant of the under-20 football side; in 2018, he was named coach of the under-16 team.

On 27 February 2021, Cortez was named Marcelo Cabo's assistant in the main squad. On 16 June, he was in charge of the side in a 0–2 Série B home loss against Avaí, after Cabo and his assistant Gabriel Cabo were sent off.

On 11 November 2021, Cortez was named interim manager of Vasco until the end of the campaign, after Fernando Diniz was sacked.

References

1974 births
Living people
Brazilian men's futsal players
Brazilian football managers
Campeonato Brasileiro Série B managers
CR Vasco da Gama managers
Brazilian expatriate sportspeople in Kuwait